College of Engineering and Technology (CEM) is an engineering institute in Kapurthala City, established by the Sarv Hitkari Educational Society, New Delhi. 

The institute received ISO 9001:2000 certification in 2005 under joint accreditation of SGS Group and UKAS (United Kingdom Accreditation Services) Quality Management.

The institute offers a B.Tech. program in six fields of engineering as well as M.Tech, MCA and MBA programs.

Departments and Centres

Undergraduate departments
Computer Science and Engineering
Information Technology
Mechanical Engineering
Electronics and Communication Engineering
Instrumentation and Control Engineering
Civil Engineering

Postgraduate departments
Master of Business Administration
Master of Computer Applications

External links
 College of Engineering and Management

Engineering colleges in Punjab, India
Kapurthala
Educational institutions established in 2002
2002 establishments in Punjab, India